Common names: red carpet viper, Kenyan carpet viper.

Echis pyramidum aliaborri is a venomous viper subspecies endemic to northern Kenya.

Description
It is distinguished from other subspecies of E. pyramidum by its relatively large supraocular scales and characteristic red-orange color.

Geographic range
It is found only in northern Kenya.

The type locality is described as "approximately 8 km north of Wajir Town, Wajir District, Kenya".

References

Further reading
 Cherlin VA. 1990. [A taxonomic revision of the snake genus Echis (Viperidae). II. An analysis of taxonomy and description of new forms]. [Proc. Zool. Inst. Leningrad ] 207: 193-223. (in Russian).
 Drews RC, Sacherer JM. 1974. A new population of carpet viper Echis carinatus from northern Kenya. Journ. East African Nat. Hist. Soc. and Natl. Mus. (145): 1-7.
 Golay P, Smith HM, Broadley DG, Dixon JR, McCarthy CJ, Rage J-C, Schätti B, Toriba M. 1993. Endoglyphs and Other Major Venomous Snakes of the World. A Checklist. Geneva: Azemiops Herpetological Data Center. 478 pp.

External links
 

Viperinae
Reptiles of Kenya
Endemic fauna of Kenya